Johnson City 2001 is a complete concert album by Widespread Panic.  The three disc set is the fifth release from the Widespread Panic archives.  The performance was recorded live at Freedom Hall Civic Center in Johnson City, Tennessee on November 20, 2001. The multi-track recording featured all original band members including the late guitarist, Michael Houser.

Track listing

Disc 1
 "L.A." (Widespread Panic) - 4:45
 "Wondering" (Widespread Panic) - 7:41
 "It Ain't No Use" (Joseph "Zigaboo" Modeliste / Art Neville / Leo Nocentelli / George Porter Jr.) - 10:27
 "Impossible" (Widespread Panic) - 5:04
 "Worry" (Widespread Panic) - 7:16
 "New Blue" (Widespread Panic) - 4:41
 "Holden Oversoul" (Widespread Panic) - 8:03
 "Stop-Go" (Widespread Panic) - 10:20
 "Makes Sense To Me" (Daniel Hutchens) - 4:27

Disc 2
 "Weak Brain, Narrow Mind" (Willie Dixon) - 9:13
 "One Arm Steve" (Widespread Panic) - 4:04
 "Old Neighborhood" (Widespread Panic) - 6:22
 "Trouble" (Cat Stevens) - 2:57
 "Love Tractor" (Widespread Panic) - 7:18
 "Pigeons" (Widespread Panic) - 11:37
 "Airplane" (Widespread Panic) - 14:06
 "Drums" (Widespread Panic) - 16:27

Disc 3
 "Drums and Bass" (Widespread Panic) - 7:41
 "Astronomy Domine" (Syd Barrett) - 2:45
 "Good Morning Little School Girl (Sonny Boy Williamson I)"- 8:16
 "The Waker" (Widespread Panic) - 4:50
 "She Caught the Katy (Taj Mahal / James Rachell)" - 4:21
 "Gimme" (Widespread Panic) - 5:24
 "Chunk of Coal" (Billy Joe Shaver) - 4:23

Personnel

Widespread Panic
 John Bell - Vocals, Guitar
 Michael Houser - Guitar, Vocals
 Dave Schools - Bass, Vocals
 Todd Nance - Drums
 John "Jojo" Hermann - Keyboards, Vocals
 Domingo "Sunny" Ortiz - Percussion

Production
 Mixed by Chris Rabold and Drew Vandenberg at Chase Park Transduction in Athens, GA.
 Recorded by Brad Blettenberg
 Mastered by Drew Vandenberg at Chase Park Transduction Studios in Athens, GA.
 Setlist by Garrie Vereen
 Additional audience recordings provided by Charles Fox

References

External links
 Widespread Panic website
 Widespread Panic Archives Blog

2010 live albums
Widespread Panic live albums